Brian Selden (born 1980 in San Diego, California) was the winner of the 1998 Magic: The Gathering World Championship.

His strategy in the tournament was to use two cards, called Survival of the Fittest and Recurring Nightmare repeatedly. The former card puts creatures into the graveyard, while the latter allows the user to return them to the battlefield without using any mana. This results in a constant cycle of resurrected creatures. Selden used this tactic to bring back utility creatures or either Verdant Force or Spirit of the Night, both very expensive, powerful, and usually game-ending cards.

Selden received his BS in Mechanical Engineering from the University of California, Berkeley in 2003, and his MS in Mechanical Engineering from MIT in 2005.

References

External links 
 1998 World Championships Coverage

1980 births
Living people
American Magic: The Gathering players
People from San Diego
UC Berkeley College of Engineering alumni
MIT School of Engineering alumni
Players who have won the Magic: The Gathering World Championship